Events in the year 1941 in China.

Incumbents
President: Lin Sen
Premier: Chiang Kai-shek
Vice Premier: Kung Hsiang-hsi
Foreign Minister: Wang Ch'ung-hui until April, then Quo Tai-chi

Events

January 
January 7–13 - New Fourth Army incident
January 30–March 1 - Battle of South Henan

March
March - Western Hubei Operation
March 14–April 9 - Battle of Shanggao

May 
May 7–27 - Battle of South Shanxi

July
 1 July - Germany and Italy both Recognized "Wang Jingwei regime" (Nanjing)
 2 July - the ROC Ministry of Foreign Affairs (Chongqing)), Announced the severance of diplomatic relations with Germany and Italy

September 
September 6 – October 8 - Battle of Changsha (1941)

December 
9 December- The government of Republic of China (The Nationalist Government (Chongqing)) declared war on  Axis powers (Japan, Germany and Italy).

Births
March 28 - Philip Fang, Hong Kong simultaneous interpretation specialist, United Nations official (d. 2013)
July - Wu Bangguo

Deaths
March 14 - Yuan Guoping and Zhou Zikun
Xiang Ying
April 24 - Xie Jinyuan

See also
 List of Chinese films of the 1940s

References

 
Years of the 20th century in China